Isse Ahmed Yusuf is a Somali politician, He previously served as the Minister of Defence of Somaliland, from December 2017 to March 2019.

See also

 Politics of Somaliland
 Ministry of Defence (Somaliland)
 Cabinet of Somaliland

References

Living people
Government ministers of Somaliland
Defence ministers of Somaliland
Somaliland politicians
Year of birth missing (living people)